The Netherlands' national women's field hockey team is currently number one on the FIH world rankings and the reigning world champion. The Netherlands is the most successful team in World Cup history, having won the title a record nine times. The team has also won nine Olympic medals.

Tournament records

Players

Current squad
The following 20 players were named on 7 June 2022 for the 2022 Women's FIH Hockey World Cup from 1 to 17 July 2022 in Amstelveen, Netherlands and Terrassa, Spain.

Caps updated as of 22 June 2022, after the match against China.

Head coach: Jamilon Mülders

Recent call-ups
The following players have been called up for the national team in the last 12 months.

Coaches
 1965–1974 – Jo Jurissen
 1975–1977 – Riet Küper
 1977–1980 – Huib Timmermans
 1980–1989 – Gijs van Heumen
 1989–1993 – Roelant Oltmans
 1993–1994 – Bert Wentink
 1994–2000 – Tom van 't Hek
 2001–2008 – Marc Lammers
 2008–2010 – Herman Kruis
 2010–2014 – Max Caldas
 2014–2015 – Sjoerd Marijne
 2015–2022 – Alyson Annan
 2022–current – Jamilon Mülders (ad interim)

See also
 Netherlands men's national field hockey team
 Netherlands women's national under-21 field hockey team

References

External links

FIH profile

Field hockey
European women's national field hockey teams
National team